Robert Crowe (born 27 May 1936) is a former Australian rules footballer who played with Carlton in the Victorian Football League (VFL).

Crowe started his career as a half forward flanker and kicked a goal with his first kick in league football. He managed 16 goals from just seven games in 1956, including a six goal haul against Richmond, kicked another 21 goals in 1957 and then 16 in 1958. From 1959 however he was used as a half back and was at his best during the early 1960s.

A former Mentone player, Crowe missed the second half of the 1959 season after suffering a pre-match injury. He had slipped in the player's race, while running onto the field for Carlton's game against Fitzroy at Brunswick Street. Despite an injury to his knee, Crowe played in the first quarter but the umpires allowed him to be substituted. He returned later in the year to play in Carlton's preliminary final loss to Essendon.

Crowe was a member of the Carlton team which were defeated in the 1962 VFL Grand Final.

He played for Dandenong in the Victorian Football Association, after leaving Carlton.

References

1936 births
Australian rules footballers from Victoria (Australia)
Carlton Football Club players
Dandenong Football Club players
Living people